Saix, Saïx or SAIX may refer to:
 Saïx, a commune in the Occitanie region of France
 Saix, Vienne, a commune in the Nouvelle-Aquitaine region of France
 Saïx (Kingdom Hearts), a fictional video-game character
 Tyler De Saix, pseudonym of Irish author Henry De Vere Stacpoole (1863–1951)
 SAIX, the South African Internet Exchange

See also 
 Le Saix, a commune in the Hautes-Alpes department, France
 Seix, a commune in the Occitanie region of France